Lepidozia is a genus of liverwort in the family Lepidoziaceae. It was first proposed by Dumortier in 1835.

Lepidozia is encompassed within the informal group: leafy II. This bright grass-green liverwort prefers old bark surfaces on the lower trunks of redwoods in Humboldt County, CA. It has pinnate branching, incubous leaf insertion, as well as leaves and underleaves that are 3-4 lobed and divided <0.5 of their length.

It contains the following species (but this list may be incomplete):
 Lepidozia azorica Buch & Perss.
 Lepidozia pearsonii Spruce
 Lepidozia reptans (L.) Dumort.
 Lepidozia ulothrix (Schwägr.) Lindenb.

References

Lepidoziaceae
Jungermanniales genera
Taxonomy articles created by Polbot
Taxa named by Barthélemy Charles Joseph Dumortier